El Pueblito may refer to;
 El Pueblito, Catamarca, Argentina
 El Pueblito, Querétaro, the seat of Corregidora Municipality, Querétaro, Mexico